S. Ramesan Nair (3 May 1948 – 18 June 2021) was an Indian lyricist and poet who worked predominantly in the Malayalam film industry. Over his career he wrote songs for over 170 films and over 3,000 devotional songs outside of the films. He debuted with the movie Pathamudhayam in 1985. He was a recipient of the Kerala Sahitya Akademi Award in 2010 and the Kendra Sahitya Akademi Award in 2018 for his collection of poems Gurupournami.

Early life 

S. Rameshan Nair was born on 3 May 1948 in a village named Kumarapuram in the present-day Kanyakumari district, in Tamil Nadu, as the son of late Shadananan Thampi and late Parvathi Amma. Due to the intense passion towards poetry, he dropped his admission for MBBS and graduated with a bachelor's degree in economics in 1966 and later completed his post graduation in Malayalam Literature in 1972. He worked as a sub editor in Kerala Bhasha Institute and also worked with the All India Radio as a producer.

Career 

Nair was a playwright, lyricist, translator and commentator of classical Indian literature such as the Tamil works Chalappathikaram and Tirukkuṟaḷ. He achieved wide appreciations as a poet through works like Sooryahridayam, before starting his accomplished career as film lyricist in 1985 by penning songs for the movie Pathamudayam. He wrote songs for 170 films and 3,000 devotional tracks.

Filmography 
Nair made his entry into Malayalam films by writing songs for Rangam in 1985 for director I.V. Sasi. Through his career he went on to write songs for over 170 films working for composers including M. G. Radhakrishnan, Ouseppachan, Berny-Ignatius, Raveendran, Vidyasagar and Shyam.

Some of the popular movies for which he wrote songs included Kuruppinte Kanakku Pustakom, Aadyathe Kanmani, Aniyan Bava Chetan Bava, 19 April, Aniyathipraavu, and Raakuyilin Raagasadassil. His notable songs in these movies included Aavaniponnunjal, Mayilay Parannuva, Manju peyyana, Aniyathipravinu, Onnanam Kunninmel, Ambadi Payyukal Meyyum, Thei Oru Thenavayal and Oru Rajamalli. His last film as lyricist was My dear Machans in 2021.

Awards and honours 

He was awarded the sixth Vennikkulam Smaraka Award instituted by the Thadiyoor Dakshina Samskarika Vedhi. Ramesan Nair was awarded the Sahitya Akademi Award in 2018 for the work Guru Pournami. He won the Kerala Sahitya Akademi award for lifetime achievement in 2010. He also received Edasseri Award,Venmani literature award,Poonthanam Jnanappana Award and Mahakavi Ulloor Memorial Literary Award and Asan Memorial Poetry Prize. He is also a recipient of the Kerala Sangeetha Nataka Akademi Award in Light Music category (2015).

Personal life 
Nair was married to his wife P. Rama, a school teacher. The couple had a son, Manu Ramesan, a music composer in the Malayalam movie industry.  Nair died at the age of 73 on 18 June 2021, at Lakshmi hospital in Ernakulam, due to COVID-19 related complications. He was diagnosed earlier with cancer, and also suffered from many other illnesses. He was cremated with full state honours on the next day. He is survived by his wife Rema, son Manu and granddaughter Mayika.

References 

1948 births
2021 deaths
20th-century Indian male writers
20th-century Indian poets
21st-century Indian male writers
21st-century Indian poets
Deaths from the COVID-19 pandemic in India
Indian male poets
Malayalam-language lyricists
Malayalam-language writers
Malayalam poets
People from Kanyakumari district
Poets from Tamil Nadu
Recipients of the Sahitya Akademi Award in Malayalam
Recipients of the Kerala Sangeetha Nataka Akademi Award